The AACTA Award for Best Screenplay in Television is an award presented by the Australian Academy of Cinema and Television Arts (AACTA).

History
From 1986 to 2010, the category was presented by the Australian Film Institute (AFI), the Academy's parent organisation, at the annual Australian Film Institute Awards (known as the AFI Awards). 

When the award was first introduced, it was handed out as two awards: Mini-Series Screenplay and Telefeature Screenplay. The name was changed to Best Screenplay in a Mini-Series or Television Drama in 1990, and the following year it became Best Screenplay in a Television Drama until 2003 where the award was renamed to its current title.

When the AFI launched the Academy in 2011, it changed the annual ceremony to the AACTA Awards, with the current award being a continuum of the AFI Award for Best Screenplay in Television. AACTA is a non-profit organisation whose aim is to "identify, award, promote and celebrate Australia's greatest achievements in film and television".

Ceremony
The award is presented at the annual AACTA Awards, which hand out accolades for achievements in feature film, television, documentaries and short films.

Winners and nominees
In the following tables, the years listed correspond to the year of film release; the ceremonies are usually held the same year. The writer and programme in bold and in yellow background have won the award. Those that are neither highlighted nor in bold are the nominees. When sorted chronologically, the tables always lists the winning writer and programme first and then the other nominees.

Best Mini-Series Screenplay

Best Telefeature Screenplay

Best Screenplay in a Mini-Series or Television Drama

Best Screenplay in a Television Drama

Best Screenplay in Television

AACTA Awards

References

External links
 Official website of the Australian Academy of Cinema and Television Arts

Screenplay in Television
Screenwriting awards for television